The Eurovision Young Musicians 2012 was the sixteenth edition of the Eurovision Young Musicians, held at the Rathausplatz in Vienna, Austria on 11 May 2012. Organised by the European Broadcasting Union (EBU) and host broadcaster Österreichischer Rundfunk (ORF), musicians from seven countries participated in the televised final. This was the fourth time that the competition was held on an open-air stage and during the annual Vienna Festival.

A total of fourteen countries took part in the competition therefore a semi-final was held at the Schubert Hall of Konzerthaus in Vienna on 5 and 6 May 2012. All participants performed a classical piece of their choice accompanied by the Vienna Symphony Orchestra, conducted by Cornelius Meister. ,  and  made their début while  returned.

Eivind Holtsmark Ringstad of Norway won the contest, with host country Austria and Armenia placing second and third respectively.

Location

Rathausplatz, a square outside the Wiener Rathaus city hall of Vienna, was the host location for the 2012 edition of the Eurovision Young Musicians final. The Schubert Hall in Vienna, Austria, hosted the semi-final round.

Format
Martin Grubinger was the host of the 2010 contest final with Pia Strauss hosting the semi-final round.

Participating countries 
This year, 14 countries participated in the Eurovision Young Musicians.

The semifinal was held in two parts. The first part was held on 5 May 2012 and the second on 6 May 2012. The seven best were selected by an international jury to perform live as finalists in the final that was held on 11 May 2012.

Semi-final

Part 1 (5 May 2012)

Part 2 (6 May 2012)

Final 
Awards were given to the top three countries. The table below highlights these using gold, silver, and bronze. The placing results of the remaining participants is unknown and never made public by the European Broadcasting Union.

Jury members 
The list of jury members are as follows:

Semi-final jury 

 – Agnieszka Duczmal (head)
 – Christian Eggen
 – Carol McGonnell
 – Franz Bartolomey

Final jury 

 – Markus Hinterhäuser (head)
 – Agnieszka Duczmal 
 – Christian Eggen
 – Carol McGonnell
 – Radek Baborák

Broadcasting
The competition was transmitted live over the Eurovision Network by 15 broadcasters.

See also
 ABU Radio Song Festival 2012
 ABU TV Song Festival 2012
 Eurovision Song Contest 2012
 Junior Eurovision Song Contest 2012

References

External links 
 

Eurovision Young Musicians by year
2012 in music
2012 in Austria
Music festivals in Austria
Events in Vienna
May 2012 events in Europe